The following lists events that happened during 1943 in Lebanon.

Incumbents
President: Émile Eddé (starting 11 November and ending 22 November), Bechara El Khoury (starting 22 November)
Prime Minister: Riad Solh (starting 25 September)

Events

August
 August 29 - 1943 Lebanese general election

References

 
Years of the 20th century in Lebanon
1940s in Lebanon
Lebanon
Lebanon